Dyschoroneura is a genus of moths in the family Geometridae.

Species
 Dyschoroneura obsolescens Warren, 1894

References
 Dyschoroneura at Markku Savela's Lepidoptera and Some Other Life Forms
 Natural History Museum Lepidoptera genus database

Ennominae